Big Boy Rides Again is a 1935 American Western film directed by Albert Herman.

Cast 
Guinn "Big Boy" Williams as Tom Duncan
Constance Bergen as Nancy Smiley
Charles K. French as John Duncan
Lafe McKee as Tap Smiley
Victor Potel as Ranch Foreman Scarface
William Gould as Lawyer Burt Hartecker
Bud Osborne as Windy
Frank Ellis as Henchman Al
Louis Vincenot as Ranch Cook Sing Fat

References

External links 

1935 films
1935 Western (genre) films
American black-and-white films
American Western (genre) films
Films directed by Albert Herman
1930s English-language films
1930s American films